The Bund Sightseeing Tunnel is a tunnel connecting the Shanghai Bund and Pudong in Shanghai, China.

Overview
The line has a total length of 646.7 meters, with two stations and 14 cars (as of 2010). Construction started in 1998 and trial operation began in October 2000. The tunnel is a single-hole double-lane tunnel, passing through the upper part of the Metro Line 2 tunnel near the end of Puxi. Various flickering lighting effects are created inside the tunnel.

The passenger-carrying system adopts an unmanned SK carriage (SK 6000 type) imported from France; the system is a fully automatic rail vehicle towed by a cable, and a turning platform is set at the terminal for the vehicle to turn around. There is an overhaul parking lot at Pudong Station.

The project was constructed as a tourist attraction. There are many tourists using it to cross the Huangpu River, although it costs more than tenfold the metro ticket. The tunnel provides a light (and sound) show; it does not display Shanghai sights. The ride takes between three and five minutes.

Stations
The two stations are located near  Shanghai Metro   Station,  Station.
Entrances:
 Puxi: 300 Zhongshan East First Road (north of Chen Yi Square);
 Pudong: 2789 Binjiang Road (under the Oriental Pearl Tower).

Price and opening hours
 Price:
 50RMB (one way, only available at Puxi entrance)
 70RMB (round trip)
 Opening hours:
 8am to 10:30pm (May 1 – October 31)
 8am to 10pm (November 1 – April 30)

See also
 Bund Tunnel, a road tunnel

References

External links
 

2001 establishments in China
Buildings and structures in Shanghai
Tourist attractions in Shanghai
Railway tunnels in China
The Bund
Cable railways